Alphonso David (born 1970) is an American lawyer, LGBT civil rights activist, former president of the Human Rights Campaign, and current president and CEO of the Global Black Economic Forum. In August 2019, he became the president of the Human Rights Campaign. He was the first civil rights lawyer and first person of color to serve as president of the organization, but was fired from his role as president on September 6, 2021 after it was revealed that he advised former New York Governor Andrew Cuomo when he was accused of sexually assaulting women. He made national headlines in 2022 for bringing litigation against the Human Rights Campaign alleging racial bias in his firing. On March 15, 2023, the Human Rights Campaign said it had settled the lawsuit and stated that the terms of the settlement were confidential.

On June 30, 2022, David was announced as the president and CEO of the Global Black Economic Forum, an organization working "to serve and advocate on behalf of the economic needs of the Black community."

Early life 
David, who is of Americo-Liberian heritage, was born in Silver Spring, Maryland. His family moved back to Monrovia, Liberia, when he was one year old. In 1977, David's father was elected mayor of his city while his great uncle William Tolbert was President of Liberia. During the 1980 Liberian coup d'état, Tolbert was assassinated and David's father was incarcerated. His family lived under house arrest for 18 months and sought political asylum in the United States when he was 10 years old.

Education 
David graduated from the University of Maryland, College Park in 1992 and Temple University Law School in 2000. While at Temple, David was a member of the university's national trial team and the Political and Civil Rights Law Review.

Career

Early career 
After graduation David worked as a judicial law clerk for the Clifford Scott Green, a Judge of the United States District Court for the Eastern District of Pennsylvania known for issuing a decision finding racial discrimination in the Philadelphia Police Department.

Next, David joined Blank Rome LLP, a national law firm based in Philadelphia, to work as a litigation associate. He also got heavily involved in pro bono work, such as helping victims of domestic violence.

Civil rights litigation 
David served as a staff attorney at the Lambda Legal Defense and Educational Fund from 2004–2007. He worked on lesbian, gay, bisexual and transgender-centered cases around the country involving issues like HIV, employment and housing accommodations. David worked on New York's first marriage equality case, Hernandez v. Robles. They won at the trial court but lost on appeal. After three years with Lambda Legal, he joined Attorney General Andrew Cuomo's Office as Bureau Chief for Civil Rights where he managed and prosecuted cases statewide ranging from deceptive business practices to immigration fraud

Counsel to New York Governor Cuomo 
David served for four years in the Governor's cabinet as the Deputy Secretary and Counsel for Civil Rights, the first position of its kind in New York State. In this capacity, he was responsible for a full range of legal, policy, legislative and operational matters affecting civil rights and labor throughout the State.

In 2015, David was appointed by Governor Andrew Cuomo to serve as Counsel to the Governor. In this role, he functioned as the Governor's chief counsel and principal legal advisor, and oversaw all significant legal and policy deliberations affecting New York State, including evaluating proposed legislation; implementing laws and policies and formulating the State's posture in both affirmative and defensive litigation.

During this tenure in the Governor's Office, David worked on landmark legislation and policy including the Marriage Equality Act, which removed legal barriers permitting same-sex couples to marry, the Workers Compensation Reform Act, which modernized key components of the program to ensure greater accountability and functionality,  the Paid Family Leave Act, which ensures individuals leave to care for a sick family member, and the Minority and Women Business Program, which expanded contracting opportunities for MWBEs throughout the state.

In New York Attorney General Letitia James's independent investigation of allegations of sexual harassment by Cuomo, released in August 2021, David's role in providing the personnel files of former Cuomo advisor Lindsey Boylan to the governor's office, which were then leaked to the press in an attempt to discredit her, is discussed. The report also states that David helped to draft a letter in defense of Cuomo and which questioned Boylan's motivations. The letter was not published.

President of the Human Rights Campaign 

In August 2019, after 12 years with the New York state government, David became president of the Human Rights Campaign (HRC).   A report released in August 2021 following an independent investigation led by New York Attorney General Letitia "Tish" James described David's efforts to cover up sexual harassment claims against Governor Andrew Cuomo and undermine the credibility of accusers. On September 6, 2021, David was fired as president of HRC.  In February 2022, David filed a lawsuit against the HRC, alleging discrimination. On March 15, 2023, HRC and David issued a joint statement that both parties had "chosen to amicably resolve" the lawsuit and that the terms of the settlement were confidential.

Personal life 
David has worked as an adjunct professor of law. He is openly gay.

Awards and honors 
In May 2017, David received the Public Servant of the Year Award from the Metropolitan Black Bar Association for his advocacy. In February 2018, the Asian American Bar Association bestowed its public service award on David. In September 2019, David received a public appreciation recognition from the Chief Judge of New York State, on behalf of the Indigent Legal Services Board, for his "extraordinary contributions to improving the quality of mandated representation in New York State. In June 2020, in honor of the 50th anniversary of the first LGBTQ Pride parade, Queerty named him among the fifty heroes "leading the nation toward equality, acceptance, and dignity for all people". In February 2023, David was named one of 50 Notable Black Leaders by Crain's New York Business in part for his work "reimagining equity and inclusion in corporate America."

References 

1970 births
2020 United States presidential electors
Activists from Maryland
African-American lawyers
American people of Liberian descent
LGBT African Americans
LGBT people from Maryland
American LGBT rights activists
Living people
New York (state) Democrats
People from Silver Spring, Maryland
Temple University Beasley School of Law alumni
University System of Maryland alumni
African-American activists
LGBT lawyers
Maryland Democrats
21st-century American LGBT people